On January 2, 1991, a US military helicopter carrying three American soldiers was shot down by the Farabundo Martí National Liberation Front (FMLN) nearby the village of Lolotique, San Miguel Department, El Salvador. The two surviving soldiers were summarily executed by FMLN forces in one of the most infamous incidents during El Salvador's civil war.

The incident occurred during the 1979–1992 Salvadoran Civil War, pitted between government forces and left-wing guerillas. Mass killings of civilians, especially by the military, were widespread during the conflict.

Around 2:15 p.m., a Bell UH-1 Iroquois making its way to Honduras was shot down by the FMLN using a surface-to-air missile. Pilot Daniel Scott was killed in the attack but two other servicemen, Lieutenant Colonel David Pickett (copilot) and Corporal Earnest Dawson (the engineer), managed to survive.

FMLN militants stole all the equipment from the helicopter and ordered locals to relocate the officers as the aircraft would be set on fire. A farmer told that the United Press International that he had left for an hour to get water for the survivors but they were already dead by time he came back.

An autopsy by an American forensic team found that Pickett and Dawson had been murdered by the guerillas, each with gunshot wounds in the head. Pickett seemed to have been raising his left arm to defend himself when he was shot.

The FMLN's initial stance was that it had shot down the plane without knowing it was American, and that Dawson and Pickett had died of their injuries later on. The FMLN later changed the narrative to one where the two soldiers were killed in a fight with guerillas.

On January 18 the FMLN put two guerrillas on trial for the incident. The Salvadoran government criticized the group for not letting the trial happen at a government tribunal.

Human Rights Watch and the Truth Commission for El Salvador both identified the FMLN as the perpetrator. Human Rights Watch said that of all FMLN war crimes during the conflicts, "perhaps none so infamous as the January 2 execution of two wounded U.S. servicemen after their helicopter was shot down over eastern El Salvador." Edward Mickolus described the shootdown as a terrorist incident in 1997.

In 1992, after the war had ended, former rebels Severiano Fuentes and Fernan Fernandez turned themselves in and admitted responsibility for the killings. An amnesty law in 1993 pardoned all fighters in the conflict from being prosecuted for war crimes, setting them free. The law was eventually reversed and in 2020, ex-guerilla Santos Guevara was arrested by Salvadoran police for his role in the shootdown.

See also 

 1980 murders of U.S. missionaries in El Salvador
 1985 Zona Rosa attacks

References

External links 

 

1991 in El Salvador
January 1991 events in North America
Salvadoran Civil War
1991 murders in North America
El Salvador–United States relations
American people murdered abroad
January 1991 crimes
1990s murders in El Salvador
Farabundo Martí National Liberation Front
San Miguel, El Salvador
Aviators killed by being shot down
20th-century aircraft shootdown incidents
Terrorist incidents in El Salvador
Terrorist incidents in North America in 1991
Far-left terrorism